The Harry S Truman School of Public Affairs is one of twenty-one schools and colleges at the University of Missouri. Established in 2001, it was previously known as the Department of Public Administration. The school mission is to "advance the knowledge and practice of governance in Missouri, the nation, and beyond by informing public policy, educating for ethical leadership in public service, and fostering democratic discourse among citizens, policy makers, and scholars." As part of the College of Arts and Science, the school awards master's, and doctoral degrees. The school is named after Missourian and U.S. President, Harry S. Truman. It was ranked the 38th best public affairs program by U.S. News & World Report in 2020.

References

External links
Official website

University of Missouri
Public administration schools in the United States
Educational institutions established in 2001
Education in Columbia, Missouri
2001 establishments in Missouri